The Westland Wasp is a small 1960s British turbine powered, shipboard anti-submarine helicopter. Produced by Westland Helicopters, it came from the same P.531 programme as the British Army Westland Scout, and is based on the earlier piston-engined Saunders-Roe Skeeter. It fulfilled the requirement of the Royal Navy for a helicopter small enough to land on the deck of a frigate and carry a useful load of two homing torpedoes.

The Wasp seriously damaged the ARA Santa Fe submarine in 1982 during the Falklands war.

Design and development
The increasing speed and attack range of the submarine threat, and the increased range at which this threat could be detected led to a Royal Navy requirement for a "Manned Torpedo-Carrying Helicopter" (MATCH). Contemporary shipboard weapons did not have the necessary range, therefore MATCH was in essence a stand-off weapon with the helicopter carrying the torpedo or other weapon to the target and being instructed when and where to drop it. Unlike the larger Wessex, the Wasp carried no sonar of its own, and was limited strictly to working in partnership with its parent ship, other ships or other ASW units.

The first prototype Saro P.531 flew on 20 July 1958, with the prototypes being subject to detailed testing by the Royal Navy, including the evaluation of several different undercarriage layouts, before settling on the definitive arrangement. An order for a pre-production batch of two "Sea Scouts" was placed in September 1961.  The first flight of the two pre-production Wasp took place on 28 October 1962.  Full production soon commenced, 98 in total being procured for the RN. The Wasp successfully exported to Brazil, the Netherlands, Indonesia, Malaysia, New Zealand and South Africa. 133 aircraft were built in total.

Wasp was essentially a navalised Scout, indeed it was originally to be called the Sea Scout, and differed mainly in design details. It had a unique 4-wheeled castering undercarriage that allowed the aircraft to be manoeuvred on small, pitching flightdecks. The Wasp had the ability of "negative pitch" from the rotor-blades which enabled the aircraft to "adhere" to the deck until the lashings were attached. Additional fuel tankage was installed in the cabin floor and both the tail boom and main rotor blades were foldable to allow stowage in the small hangars fitted to the first generation helicopter-carrying escorts. It was fitted with a winch above the starboard rear door, and also had the capacity to carry underslung loads from the semi automatic cargo release unit mounted under the fuselage. With a crew of 2 (Pilot and Missile Aimer/Aircrewman) and the capacity to seat 3 passengers Wasp was useful for short-range transport missions, and for casualty evacuation with room for one stretcher fitted across the rear cabin area.

Later modifications included the ability to carry the Nord SS.11 wire-guided missile, with the fitting of the Aimers sight in the left cockpit roof and the installation of large inflatable emergency floats in sponsons on either side of the cabin to prevent capsizing of the top-heavy aircraft in the event of ditching. The SS.11 had limited range targeting small surface targets such as patrol boats or shore positions, and was later replaced by the AS.12, which effectively had double the range.

Operational history

Royal Navy

The Wasp HAS.1 was introduced to service in the small ships role in 1964, after an intensive period of trials by 700(W) IFTU between June 1963 and March 1964. It served in this primary role with 829 Naval Air Squadron, but also in training units to supply crews for the front line with 706 NAS between 1965 and 1967 and in 703 NAS between 1972 and 1981. Single airframes also served for light liaison duties in the Commando Assault squadrons, 845 NAS and 848 NAS until 1973. Although effective as a submarine killer, it was best deployed paired with a Wessex HAS.3 submarine hunter. In the late 1970s, the Westland Lynx started to replace the Wasp.

The Wessex and a Westland Lynx HAS.2 from  then attacked it with depth charges, a Mk 46 torpedo, and also strafed it with GPMG. Santa Fe was damaged badly enough to prevent her from submerging. The crew abandoned the submarine at the jetty on South Georgia and surrendered to the British forces, thus becoming the first casualty of the sea war, as well as the first direct engagement by the Royal Navy Task Force.

The last Wasp was finally withdrawn from service in 1988 when the last of the Type 12  frigates was decommissioned.

Royal Malaysian Navy
The Wasp came into service with the Royal Malaysian Navy quite late, compared to the others nations who procured the aircraft. She joined the RMN on 8 April 1988. The Wasp had a relatively short career with that navy, being phased out just ten years later when they were replaced by the Eurocopter Fennec.

Royal New Zealand Navy
The first four of an eventual nineteen Wasps were purchased by the Royal New Zealand Navy in 1966, being immediately assigned to the new  frigate, . They provided numerous tasks, as well as taking part in the Armilla Patrol in the Persian Gulf during the 1980s. The Wasps were flown by RNZN pilots but maintained by ground crews of No. 3 Squadron RNZAF.

In 1997, four Wasps performed a flypast, marking the arrival of the new  frigate, HMNZS Te Kaha.

The Wasp served 32 years with the RNZN, retiring in 1998, the same year HMNZS Waikato, which first operationally deployed the Wasp in New Zealand, was herself decommissioned. They were replaced by the SH-2 Seasprite as a stop gap until the Arrival of their SH-2G(NZ).

Royal Netherlands Navy

With the Royal Netherlands Navy beginning in the late 1960s, after the fire onboard , NATO anti-submarine commitments were taken over by a squadron of Westland Wasp helicopters, operated from six  anti-submarine frigates. The shore base was at De Kooy. The Royal Netherlands Navy 860 Naval Air Squadron received 12 Wasp helicopters between November 1966 and June 1967, operated from Van Speijk-class frigates as AH-12As and flown in the ASW role. The last of the Dutch Wasps were eventually withdrawn from service in 1981 when they were replaced by the Westland Lynx.

Other operators
The Wasp was also in service with the Brazilian, Indonesian, and South African navies. The Indonesian aircraft were all former Dutch aircraft and the last of the type in active service.

The last of the ten surplus Dutch Navy helicopters refurbished by Westland for the Indonesian Navy was grounded in 1998. Flown by 400 Squadron (RON 400) from NAS Juanda, when at sea they were embarked upon the Indonesian Navy's ex-Royal Navy  and ex-Dutch Navy s.

The Brazilian Navy operated the Wasp as the UH-2 & UH-2A taking delivery of three new build helicopters in April 1966 and a further seven ex-Royal Navy helicopters in 1977. 1º Esquadrão de Helicópteros de Emprego Geral (HU-1) flew the helicopters from Navy's  and -class destroyers and the s.

The South African Navy received their first batch of ten new build airframes in 1963, which was followed by the delivery of a second batch of further 8 from 1973. Only six of this batch were delivered due to the international arms embargo placed on South Africa during the apartheid regime. The Wasps were flown by 22 Flight, from Ysterplaat, the unit subsequently became 22 Squadron, Maritime Command in 1976. The helicopters were operated from the navy's  frigates. The South African Navy also acquired one ex-Bahrain Public Security Force airframe as an instructional airframe to support its Wasp programme. The South African Navy withdrew their last Wasp in 1990.

Variants

Sea Scout HAS.1
The Sea Scout HAS.1 was the original Royal Navy designation for the Wasp.
Wasp HAS.1
Shipboard anti-submarine warfare helicopter for the Royal Navy.

Operators

 Brazilian Navy

 Indonesian Navy

 Royal Malaysian Navy

 Royal Netherlands Navy

 Royal New Zealand Navy

 South African Navy

 Royal Navy
 700W Naval Air Squadron
 703 Naval Air Squadron
 705 Naval Air Squadron
 706 Naval Air Squadron
 771 Naval Air Squadron
 829 Naval Air Squadron
 845 Naval Air Squadron
 848 Naval Air Squadron
 860 Naval Air Squadron

Aircraft on display

Brazil
On display
Wasp HAS.1 N-7039, which was XT433 in the Royal Navy from 1965 to 1978, is on display at Campo Dos Afonsos.

Germany
On display
Wasp HAS.1 (XS569) is on display at the Flugaustellung L&P Junior, Hermeskeil.

Indonesia
On display
Wasp HAS.1 HS-434 of the Indonesian Navy, former "Marineluchtvaartdienst" 243, is on display as gate guardian at Juanda Naval Air Station in Surabaya.
Wasp HAS.1 Unknown of the Indonesian Navy, is on display at Naval Doctrine, Education and Training Development Command in Surabaya.

Malaysia
On display
Wasp HAS.1 M499-01, which was XV636 in the Royal Navy, is on display at the Royal Pahang Museum, Pekan, Malaysia.
Wasp HAS.1 M499-07, which was XT426 in the Royal Navy from 1965 to 1992, is on display at the Maritime Museum, Malacca, Malaysia.

New Zealand
On display
Wasp HAS.1 NZ3906 is on display at the Royal New Zealand Air Force Museum in Christchurch.

Netherlands

On display
 AH-12A Wasp 235 of the "Marineluchtvaartdienst" (MLD), former Royal Navy Wasp HAS.1 XT795, is on display at the Traditiekamer Marineluchtvaartdienst at De Kooy.

United Kingdom
Airworthy
G-BYCX a former South African Wasp Mk 1B is owned by Military Vehicle Solutions Ltd. in Dunchurch, Rugby.
G-CBUI a former Royal Navy (XT420) Wasp HAS.1 is owned by the Fly Navy Heritage Trust at RNAS Yeovilton and flies in Royal Navy markings as XT420.
G-CGGK a former 829 NAS Wasp HAS.1 (was RN serial number XT434) is owned by Aeromedical Training Ltd. in Wiltshire.
G-CMBE (previously registered as G-KANZ) a former Royal Navy (XT782) and former RNZN (NZ3909) Wasp HAS.1 is privately owned and flies in RNZN markings as NZ3909.
G-KAXT a former Royal Navy (XT787) and Royal New Zealand Navy (NZ3905) Wasp HAS.1 is privately owned in Hampshire and, as a frequent visitor to airshows, is flown in Royal Navy south Atlantic camouflage scheme wearing the badge of HMS Endurance and its original tail number of XT787.
G-RIMM a former Royal Navy (XT435) and RNZN (NZ3907) Wasp HAS.1 is privately owned and flies marked as XT435.
On display
Wasp HAS.1 XS527 is on display at Fleet Air Arm Museum, Yeovilton.
Former Endurance Flight Wasp HAS.1 XS567 is on display at the Imperial War Museum Duxford.
Wasp HAS.1 XT443 is on display at The Helicopter Museum, Weston-super-Mare.
Wasp HAS.1 XT788 is based in Devon, England but is displayed at various locations around the United Kingdom as a focal point for charity collection.

Stored or under restoration
G-BZPP a Wasp HAS.1 (was RN serial number XT793) is privately owned in Surrey and flew in Royal Navy markings as XT793, but does not have a current permit to fly.
Wasp HAS.1s XT427 and XT778 are held in storage by the Fleet Air Arm Museum, Yeovilton.
Former 829 NAS Wasp HAS.1 XT439 is privately owned in Hertfordshire.
Wasp HAS.1 XT437 is held by the Boscombe Down Aviation Collection at Old Sarum Airfield.

A small number of helicopters are still used by the military and technical colleges for maintenance and engineering training.

Specifications (Wasp HAS.1)

See also

References

Citations

Bibliography

 Burden, Rodney A., Draper, Michael I., Rough, Douglas A., Smith, Colin R. and Wilton, David. Falklands: The Air War. Twickenham, UK: British Aviation Research Group, 1986. .
Donald, David and Lake, Jon. (eds.) Encyclopedia of World Military Aircraft. London:Aerospace Publishing, Single volume edition, 1996. .
 
 Friedman, Norman. British Destroyers & Frigates: The Second World War and After. Barnsley, UK: Seaforth Publishing, 2006. .
James, Derek N. Westland Aircraft since 1915. London:Putnam, 1991, .

Scout and Wasp: An All British Success Dave Billinge Aviation News Vol 71 No 2 February2009

External links

 Helicopter History site section on the Wasp
 Westland Wasp photogroup on Flickr.

1960s British military utility aircraft
Aircraft first flown in 1962
Anti-submarine helicopters
Military helicopters
1960s British helicopters
Single-turbine helicopters
Wasp